Marwa Elselehdar (sometimes written El-Selehdar) is the first Egyptian female ship captain. She graduated from the Arab Academy for Science, Technology & Maritime Transport in 2013, the first female graduate of the Department of Maritime Transport and Technology, and as of April 2021 has a rank of first mate on the Aida IV.

Life
Both she and her brother enrolled at the Arab Academy for Science, Technology & Maritime Transport (AASTMT), she in the International Transport and Logistics Department and he in the Department of Maritime Transport and Technology, which only accepted men at the time. She later applied to DMTT anyway, and after a legal review by Hosni Mubarak she was allowed to join, becoming the only woman amongst 1200 students. She faced sexism throughout her studies, but graduated in 2013, and later rose to the rank of First Mate.

She was honoured by Abdel Fattah el-Sisi in 2017 during Egypt's Women's Day celebrations. She will take her final exam to attain the rank of captain in May 2021.

She also has a Masters in Business Administration from Cardiff Metropolitan University.

Ever Given rumours 
When the Ever Given caused a blockage of the Suez Canal in 2021, social media propagated rumours about her being the captain and responsible for the incident. However the rumors were incorrect, since at the time of the incident she was first mate of the Aida IV, which was hundreds of miles away in Alexandria. Aida IV is an Egyptian maritime safety authority vessel which runs supply missions to a Red Sea lighthouse and for training cadets at AASTMT.

References

21st-century Egyptian women
1990s births
Living people
Sea captains
Arab Academy for Science, Technology & Maritime Transport alumni